Liston (Greek: Λιστόν) is the name of a pedestrian street and district in the western edge of Spianada in Corfu (city).

It was constructed during the French rule in the Ionian Islands (1807–1814) imitating the rue de Rivoli. It is one of the most popular sites in the city. Its name comes from the Venetian liston.

Residents
Dionysios Solomos

References

French rule in the Ionian Islands (1807–1814)
Buildings and structures in Corfu (city)